Rodion Ruslanovich Amirov (born 2 October 2001, Salavat, Republic of Bashkortostan, Russia) is a Russian professional ice hockey forward who is currently a prospect under contract to the Toronto Maple Leafs of the National Hockey League (NHL). He was drafted in the first round, 15th overall by the Maple Leafs in the 2020 NHL Entry Draft.

Playing career
Amirov played as a kid within hometown club, Salavat Ufa of the Kontinental Hockey League (KHL). Amirov played through junior affiliates, Tolpar Ufa and Supreme Hockey League farm club, Toros Neftekamsk before making his debut with Salavat Yulaev Ufa in the KHL during the 2019–20 season.

Amirov as a 19 year-old appeared in a career best 39 games for Salavat Yulaev in his second KHL season with Ufa in 2020–21, recording 9 goals and 13 points to rank third among under-20 skaters in the KHL before going scoreless in nine playoff games for the club.

On 15 April 2021, Amirov agreed to a three-year entry-level contract with draft club, the Toronto Maple Leafs. He immediately moved to North America, to be assigned to the Maple Leafs AHL affiliate, the Toronto Marlies, for the remainder of the 2020–21 season.

On 23 February 2022, Toronto Maple Leafs General Manager Kyle Dubas shared that Amirov was diagnosed with a brain tumor and was undergoing treatment.

Career statistics

Regular season and playoffs

International

Awards and honours

References

External links
 

2001 births
Living people
National Hockey League first-round draft picks
People from Salavat
Russian ice hockey left wingers
Salavat Yulaev Ufa players
Tolpar Ufa players
Toros Neftekamsk players
Toronto Maple Leafs draft picks
Sportspeople from Bashkortostan